This is a list of villages of Chernivtsi Oblast in alphabetical order categorized by raion. More thorough lists of communities are available for each raion.

Chernivtsi Raion
Bahrynivka 
Banyliv Pidhirnyi
Bayraky 
Borivtsi
 Bridok
 Chahor
 Chunkiv
 Kostychany
 Kostyntsi
 Kulivtsi
 Kyseliv
 Luzhany
 Molodiia 
 Mykhalcha
 Panka
 Repuzhyntsi
 Shypyntsi
 Shyshkivtsi
 Stara Krasnoshora
 Tarasivtsi
 Toporivtsi
 Tysovets
 Vasyliv
 Verenchanka

Dnistrovskyi Raion
Anadoly 
Babyn 
Selyshche

Vyzhnytsia Raion
 Ispas

See also
 List of Canadian place names of Ukrainian origin

Chernivtsi